Khairul Izuan Abdullah (born 16 May 1986) is a Malaysian footballer who plays as a striker for Malaysia Premier League side PDRM FA. He is also a police officer, ranked lance corporal, for the Royal Malaysian Police.

In 2012, Khairul emerged as the top goalscorer in the 2012 Malaysia Premier League with 27 goals.

During 2012 Malaysia Cup Khairul was loaned to the Negeri Sembilan and he scored 2 goals in 8 appearances.

In 2014, Khairul won the Malaysia Premier League with PDRM FA.

Honours

Club

PDRM FA
Malaysia Premier League: 2014

References

External links
 

1986 births
Living people
Malaysian people of Malay descent
Malaysian footballers
People from Kedah

Association football forwards
PDRM FA players
Negeri Sembilan FA players